Laurel Branch is an unincorporated community in Monroe County, West Virginia, United States. Laurel Branch is located near the Virginia border, southeast of Union.

References

Unincorporated communities in Monroe County, West Virginia
Unincorporated communities in West Virginia